Gamma-renin is an enzyme. This enzyme catalyses the following chemical reaction

 Cleavage of the Leu-Leu bond in synthetic renin substrate (horse), to produce angiotensin I, but not active on natural angiotensinogen

This enzyme is present in submandibular glands of male mice.

References

External links 
 

EC 3.4.21